FK Morava is a Serbian football club based in Ribare, Serbia.

History

Current team
Stefan Belíc,
Jhonatan Espinosa

Morava Ribare